Mohan Lall Shrimal (born 4 January 1923) is a former chief justice of Sikkim High Court. He hails from Jaipur in Rajasthan state in India. In 2001 he was awarded Maharana Mewar award.

Shrimal was born in 1923 and was educated at Maharana Bhupal College, Udaipur, Christian College, Indore and Holkar College, Indore.

Shrimal worked as Pleader of the Mewar High Court at Udaipur in the former Mewar State from 1948 and Advocate of the Rajasthan High Court at Jodhpur from 1951.

Positions held 
Deputy Government Advocate from 1 September 1966 to 24 October 1969.
Additional Government Advocate from 25 October 1969 to 12 July 1973.
Government Advocate-cum-Additional Advocate General, Rajasthan from 13 July 1973 to 30 September 1974.
Additional Judge of the Rajasthan High Court from 7 October 1974.
Appointed Permanent Judge on 10 May 1976.
Chief Justice, Sikkim High Court on 17 December 1983 to 4 January 1985.

References 

1923 births
Possibly living people
20th-century Indian judges
People from Udaipur
Chief Justices of the Sikkim High Court
Judges of the Rajasthan High Court
Rajasthani people